The Lyulka AL-21 is an axial flow turbojet engine created by the Soviet Design Bureau named for its chief designer Arkhip Lyulka.

Design and development

The AL-21 is closely similar in technology to the General Electric J79 first flown in 1955, which was the first engine for supersonic flight, using a variable stator. 

It is generally described as being in the "third generation" of Soviet gas turbine engines which are characterized by high thrust-to-weight ratios and the use of turbine air cooling. 

The AL-21 entered service in the early 1960s. Later designed the AL-21F3, it was used in the Sukhoi Su-17, Sukhoi Su-24, Ground-attack variant Mikoyan-Gurevich MiG-23, and Sukhoi T-10 (Sukhoi Su-27 prototype).

Specifications (AL-21F3)

See also

References

External links

Page of the engine at Russian Aircraft Encyclopedia

AL-21
1960s turbojet engines